The Hainan International Film Festival is a film festival held in Sanya, Hainan, China. The inaugural festival was held from December 9 to 16, and included forums, ceremonies, and competitions. Actor Jackie Chan is the promotional ambassador.

Along with Chan, the festival was attended by a number of international film personalities, including Turkish film director Nuri Bilge Ceylan, Bollywood star Aamir Khan, and Hollywood film stars such as Johnny Depp, Nicolas Cage and Mads Mikkelsen. The festival's top prize was awarded to Dying to Survive, with the award presented by Khan.

References

External links
 

2018 establishments in China
Film festivals in China
December events
Film festivals established in 2018
Tourist attractions in Sanya